"Love Is" is the title of a 1993 duet written by Tonio K,  Michael Caruso  and John Keller, and originally recorded and released by American singer and actress Vanessa Williams and American R&B recording artist Brian McKnight. The single originally appeared on the soundtrack to the television drama series Beverly Hills, 90210; and was also used in the spin-off series Melrose Place. After this exposure, the song peaked at number three on the Billboard Hot 100, becoming McKnight's breakthrough hit and another hit for Williams. The song peaked at number one on the Billboard Adult Contemporary chart, where it spent three weeks at the summit.

There were two different versions released to radio: the more common mix includes energetic electric guitar performing the solo in the bridge; an alternate, lesser-known mix presents melodic solo piano, performed by Philippe Saisse at the bridge. The edit version was that of the guitar mix, which presented a fade out during the second of the two ending chorus refrains. This mix appears on McKnight's greatest hits album, From There to Here: 1989-2002 without the fade, although the piano solo ending is slightly trimmed. The "piano mix" also appears on Williams's Greatest Hits - The First Ten Years album.

Critical reception
A reviewer from Music & Media commented "What is love? Find out through this dramatic ballad on the right side of kitsch." Head of music Karsten Bendix at Radio Roskilde/Denmark enthused, "I love those harmonies. There are so many ballads around, but these two people can really sing." Alan Jones from Music Week wrote, "This intense, brooding duet is no award winner, issuing every cliche in the book and then some. But it has a certain insidious quality, and the fact that it is featured on Beverly Hills 90210 may be enough to tip the scales in its favour."

Charts

Weekly charts

Year-end charts

Cover versions
In 1994, jazz fusion saxophonist Nelson Rangell covered the song for his album Yes, Then Yes.

References

The Billboard Book of Top 40 Hits, 6th Edition, 1996

External links
Discogs

1993 singles
Vanessa Williams songs
Brian McKnight songs
Male–female vocal duets
Giant Records (Warner) singles
1992 songs